The inaugural 2013 Euro Winners Cup was a beach soccer tournament that took place on two pitches at the UMPI Smart Beach Arena stadium, located at the Riviera delle Palme resort in San Benedetto del Tronto, Italy, from 15 – 19 May 2013. The tournament brought together club champions of many domestic beach soccer leagues across Europe, almost in the same vein as the UEFA Champions League.

Participating teams
Twenty teams confirmed their participation in the inaugural tournament:

 Baku FC
 FC BATE Borisov
 Sandown Sociedad
 SC Montredon Bonneveine
 AO Kefallinia
 Goldwin Pluss
 "Falfala" Kfar Qassem
 ASD Terracina BS
 Sambenedettese BS
 Viareggio BS
 Kreiss
 Lexmax
 Beach Soccer Egmond
 Grembach Łódź
 CF Os Belenenses
 Lokomotiv Moscow
 Gimnàstic de Tarragona
 Grasshopper Club Zurich
 Beşiktaş JK
 Griffin Kyiv

Format and draw
The first Beach Soccer Winner Cup was held in the sands of San Benedetto del Tronto, Rive delle Palme which located in Ascoli, Italy from 15–19 May 2013. This Cup is involving all the champions in the different official National Leagues all across the Old Continent, 18 different countries will be represented in this tournament.

In the first stage, the eighteen champions of the officially sanctioned Beach Soccer National Championships, plus the host and the Italian runner-up got distributed into five groups, yet offering interesting battles with powerful teams having to compete for the head of the group.

Only the sides topping the group will be granted a ticket to the quarterfinals stage, accompanied by the three best second-ranked teams.

Stadium
The stadium that was used is called the UMPI Smart Beach Arena. The new state-of-the-art facility is intended to maximize the technology and the environmental consciousness directives to create a stadium that offers 360-degree amusement possibilities both for citizens and tourists.

Online
Due to the facility not having satellite capabilities, the tournament was not streamed online by BSWW.

Rosters
The complete rosters for all participating teams can be found on the BSWW web site.

Group stage
The draw to divide the teams into five groups of four was conducted on 19 April 2013.

All kickoff times are of local time in San Benedetto del Tronto, (UTC+1).

Group A

Group B

Group C

Group D

Group E

Knockout stage
A draw will be held after the group stage matches were completed to determine the quarterfinal pairings.

Quarterfinals

Fifth-place Semifinals

Championship Semifinals

Seventh-place final

Fifth-place final

Third-place final

Championship final

Winners

Awards

Final standings

See also
Beach soccer
Beach Soccer Worldwide

References

External links
Beach Soccer Worldwide

Euro Winners Cup
2012–13 in Italian football
2013
Sport in le Marche
2013 in beach soccer